Nyona Lake is a lake near the town of Macy, Indiana in Fulton County.

Originally known as North Mud Lake it was renamed for Nyona Shaffer, whose family operated a cabin rental business on the lakefront in the 1920's. Early investors in the lake's recreation business included Chevrolet founder Louis Chevrolet who operated a dancehall and refreshment stands.

References

External links
Nyona Lake

Bodies of water of Fulton County, Indiana
Lakes of Indiana